The Childress-Ray House is a historic house in Murfreesboro, Tennessee, U.S. It was built in 1847. In 1874, it was purchased by John Childress, the brother of U.S. First Lady Sarah Childress Polk, brother-in-law of U.S. President James K. Polk, and the father-in-law of Tennessee Governor John C. Brown. Former First Lady Sarah Polk was a frequent visitor.

The house was first designed in the Greek Revival architectural style, and later remodelled in the Italianate architectural style. It has been listed on the National Register of Historic Places since December 27, 1979.

References

Houses on the National Register of Historic Places in Tennessee
Greek Revival architecture in Tennessee
Italianate architecture in Tennessee
Houses completed in 1847
Buildings and structures in Murfreesboro, Tennessee
Polk family